The 26th Goya Awards were presented on 19 February 2012 to honour the best in Spanish films of 2011 and the ceremony was hosted by Spanish comedian Eva Hache. On January 10, 2012 the nominees were announced. No Rest for the Wicked won six awards, including Best Film, Best Director and Best Actor.

Nominees

Major awards

Other award nominees

Honorary Goya
Josefina Molina

References

External links
Official Website of the Goya Awards 2012
Information of the Goya Awards 2012

26
2011 film awards
2011 in Spanish cinema
2012 in Madrid